Urimaikural is a 1974 Indian Tamil-language action drama film, written and directed by C. V. Sridhar. The film stars M. G. Ramachandran, Latha, Anjali Devi and V. S. Raghavan. It was released on 7 November 1974, and became a silver jubilee hit.

Plot 
Gopinath and his elder brother Sundaram Pillai are very close, live under the same roof, and are very respected farmers. Gopi is happy-go-lucky and has fun while also working hard on their farm. Radha is his love interest. Duraisamy, Gopi's rival for Radha's love, wants to eliminate Gopi so that he can marry her. He arranges events such that Radha gets betrothed to Gopi. He also loans money to Sundaram and extracts word from him that Gopi won't interfere in the marriage which Gopi agrees to ratify.

However, Radha and Gopi meet one last time and are caught by Duraisamy and Sundaram. One thing leads to another and Gopi and Radha are married while being excommunicated by Sundaram from their family. They even have a partition. Duraisamy now wants revenge and he arranges to make it look like Sundaram has swindled money belonging to the village. They give him a year to return the money failing which all his property would be confiscated. At this juncture, Gopi works hard, fights off Duraisamy's henchmen and returns the money while also exposing him as the original thief.

Cast 
M. G. Ramachandran as Gopi (alias Gopinath)
Latha as Radha
Anjali Devi as Parvathi, Sundaram Pillai's wife
M. N. Nambiar as Duraisamy
S. V. Sahasranamam as Sundaram Pillai
V. K. Ramasamy as Kozhaidhar Pulai
C. K. Saraswathi
V. S. Raghavan as Sabapathy
Nagesh as Sadhasivam
Thengai Srinivasan as Paramasivam
Pushpalatha as Muthamma
Sachu as Sachu/Sarasa
Typist Gopu as Bai
Samikannu as Villager
Karikol Raju
Usilai Mani
Gemini Mali as Iyer

Production 
M. G. Ramachandran and Sridhar earlier were supposed to work in a film called Andru Sindhiya Ratham which got shelved. According to Sridhar, the reason for Ramachandran backing out may have been that, since Sridhar launched both Kadhalikka Neramillai (1964) and Andru Sindhiya Ratham at the same time, he promoted Kadhalikka Neramillai as the first contemporary colour film in Tamil but did not do the same for Andru Sindhiya Ratham, which may have made Ramachandran upset, causing him to leave. Sridhar, who was reeling under financial problems due to failure of his previous film Alaigal and also his other film Vaira Nenjam was getting delayed due to call sheet issues of Sivaji Ganesan, as per the advice of his friend, the Hindi actor Rajendra Kumar, decided to collaborate with Ramachandran who agreed to act under his direction. Sridhar revealed that Urimai Kural was inspired from the Telugu film Dasara Bullodu (1971); he took only the basic plot from that film and made changes for Tamil version. When Gopu saw the film he suggested Sridhar to do this film with Ganesan however Gopu was shocked when Sridhar said he would make this film with Ramachandran. Gopu who received opportunities as director after the success of his debut directorial Kasethan Kadavulada (1972) wanted to concentrate on directing films, which led both of them to part ways professionally but still remained friends.

The cinematography for the film was handled by N. Balakrishnan; however the climax portions were shot by Thambu as Balakrishnan had to shoot the climax for another film. The film was predominantly shot at a village Mugalivakkam near the garden belonging to Ramachandran while the climax portions were shot at land belonging to actor-producer K. Balaji and the songs were shot at Mysore.

Soundtrack 
The music was composed by M. S. Viswanathan. The song "Vizhiye Kadhai Ezhudhu" is set to Kambhoji raga. This song and "Aambalaingala" were penned by Kannadasan, it was added by Sridhar when political issues led to a widening rift between Ramachandran and Kannadasan. But Sridhar could not get a satisfactory response to the situation. So Sridhar and Viswanathan decided to convince Ramachandran to have Kannadasan's song and Ramachandran accepted the proposal as he bore no personal grudge against the lyricist.

Release and reception 
Ananda Vikatan favourably reviewed the film, particularly the climax for its pace. The film became a blockbuster at box-office.

References

External links 
 

1970s action drama films
1970s Tamil-language films
1974 films
Films directed by C. V. Sridhar
Films scored by M. S. Viswanathan
Films with screenplays by C. V. Sridhar
Indian action drama films